Handyman Superstar Challenge (also referred to as Superstar Handyman Challenge from the show's first season logo) is a television game show on HGTV Canada, hosted by Karen Bertelsen. The show seeks to find the best handyman in Canada, with the winner originally being awarded the opportunity to host a show on HGTV in the first season, though no prize is explicitly mentioned in subsequent years. However, the winner of Handyman Superstar Challenge is traditionally given a guest appearance in a Mike Holmes television series (Holmes on Homes or Holmes Inspection; Holmes in New Orleans did not feature any Handyman Superstar Challenge contestants).

Handyman Superstar Challenge was filmed at the Evergreen Brick Works facilities in Toronto, Ontario, with episodes taking place on consecutive days.

A US spin-off of the series was created in 2010, to air on HGTV (USA), called All American Handyman. "Handyman Superstar Challenge" was replaced by a successor series on HGTV Canada called Canada's Handyman Challenge.

Format
10 contestants qualify for the competition through submissions to the HGTV website. Since the third season, 20 contestants arrive to Toronto for a qualifying challenge for 10 open competition spots.

At the start of each day, the contestants are taken from their hotel rooms at dawn and taken to the site of the challenges.  In the first season, there was only one challenge (due to the episodes being 30 minutes instead of the 60 minutes of the later seasons, to match those of its sister shows). In the second season, there were two challenges per day: a "handyman" challenge showcasing the contestants' skills in the morning, and a "superstar" challenge showcasing the contestants' presentation ability in the afternoon. Mike Holmes, Jim Caruk, and HGTV casting agent Shasta Lutz are the judges for the first two seasons.

Since the third season, starting with the second day of competition (the first day for the qualifying challenge and the "Lion's Den challenge" where head judges Mike Holmes and Jim Caruk evaluate the contestants' basic skills), there is a compulsory challenge in the morning, for which there is a guest judge presiding (neither Mike and Jim are present at the morning challenge). The guest judge may offer advice to contestants on their project.  When the challenge ends, Mike and Jim arrive to give a preliminary evaluation with the guest judge (this is a blind evaluation; Mike and Jim do not know which contestant is associated with which project, though after a few days they invariably guess correctly). After the contestants return and defend their works in front of the judges, and a second evaluation determines which of the remaining contestants will not have to partake in the evening "redemption challenge" (and are safe from being eliminated). Normally, three contestants partake in the redemption challenge, except for the one pairs challenge each year, where two teams (four contestants) partake in the redemption challenge (which is an individual affair). The redemption challenge is often related to the main challenge, and both Mike and Jim (but not the guest judge) preside over the challenge.

The worst performer, as deemed by the judges, is eliminated from competition (two in the episode with the pairs challenge).

Eliminations continue until three contestants remain, from which one of the three would be named the Handyman Superstar after a final head-to-head challenge.

Synopsis

Season 1 
The ten finalists, as chosen by the judges, for the first season are the following:

Season 2
Although the format remains the same for Season 2, various minor changes have been made to match the format of the fourth season of Designer Superstar Challenge, including having the challenges take place on consecutive days, requiring the contestants to live together in a luxury loft, and the initial "three rooms" challenge. The second season also further separated the skill-based "Handyman" challenges (which themselves de-emphasized the need for skills more suited for professional contractors, such as home renovation estimates) and the presentation-based "Superstar" challenges.  The look-and-feel is also altered to match the fourth season of Designer, which is also consistent with the third season of Chef and the first season of Hair.

The ten finalists for the second season are as follows:

Season 3
In the third season, 20 contestants are invited instead of ten, although in the first challenge, where contestants have 90 minutes to create a work out of two sheets of plywood, the field is reduced down to ten. Only the ten people advancing from this challenge are considered to be the finalists. Shasta Lutz is not returning in this season, leaving only Mike Holmes and Jim Caruk as judges. However, in every episode (except the first and last) there will be a guest judge joining them. Instead of a presentation-oriented challenge, the bottom finishers from the main challenge will compete in a "play-in" elimination challenge later that day.

 BYE - Contestant advanced without competing in the evening challenge.
 IN - Contestant competed in the evening challenge, and managed to advanced
 OUT - Contestant has been eliminated

Season 4
Season 4 continues the same format as the third season.  In one change, each of the contestants has a space on the "Handyman Superstar Locker" for their toolbelts; contestants take down their toolbelts as they are eliminated. In the center of the locker is the Handyman Superstar Belt with both Mike's and Jim's autographs, which is given to the winner at the end of the competition.

Season 5

2010

A spin-off series replaced "Handyman Superstar Challenge" on the HGTV schedule, based on it, but with a greatly compressed format.

2011

The US series again replaced the Canadian series in its season slot of new shows.

2012

The series was replaced by Canada's Handyman Challenge, with a revamped format, with similar challenges, but broader competition draw, in 2012.

2013

The series was replaced again by its spin-off for 2013.

2014

The series was replaced again by its spin-off for 2014.

References

External links
 Official Handyman Superstar Challenge homepage

See also
 Canada's Worst Handyman
 Canada's Handyman Challenge
 All American Handyman

2006 Canadian television series debuts
2010 Canadian television series endings
English-language television shows
HGTV (Canada) original programming
Television shows filmed in Toronto
2000s Canadian game shows